The BBCH-scale is used to identify the phenological development stages of plants. BBCH-scales have been developed for a range of crop species where similar growth stages of each plant are given the same code.

Phenological development stages of plants are used in a number of scientific disciplines (crop physiology, phytopathology, entomology and plant breeding) and in the agriculture industry (risk assessment of pesticides, timing of pesticide application, fertilization, agricultural insurance). The BBCH-scale uses a decimal code system, which is divided into principal and secondary growth stages, and is based on the cereal code system (Zadoks scale) developed by Jan Zadoks.

The abbreviation BBCH derives from the names of the originally participating stakeholders: "Biologische Bundesanstalt, Bundessortenamt und CHemische Industrie". Allegedly, the abbreviation is said to unofficially represent the four companies that initially sponsored its development; Bayer, BASF, Ciba-Geigy, and Hoechst.

Basic principles 
 The BBCH-scale provides a framework to develop scales for individual crops.
 Similar growth stages of each plant species are given the same BBCH code.
 Each code has a description and important growth stages have additional drawings included.
 The first digit of the scale refers to the principal growth stage.
 The second digit refers to the secondary growth stage which corresponds to an ordinal number or percentage value.
 Post harvest or storage treatment is coded as 99.
 Seed treatment before planting is coded as 00.

Principal growth stages 
 0: Germination, sprouting, bud development
 1: Leaf development
 2: Formation of side shoots, tillering
 3: Stem elongation or rosette growth, shoot development
 4: Development of harvestable vegetative plant parts, bolting
 5: Inflorescence emergence, heading
 6: Flowering
 7: Development of fruit
 8: Ripening or maturity of fruit and seed
 9: Senescence, beginning of dormancy

See also
BBCH-scales for plants or plant groups:

Bean
Beet
Bulb vegetable
Canola, rapeseed
Cereals
Citrus
Coffee
Cotton
Cucurbit
Currants
Faba bean
Grape
Hop
Leafy vegetables forming heads
Leafy vegetables not forming heads
Maize, corn
Musacea
Olive
Other brassica vegetables
Pea
Peanut
Pome fruit
Potato
Rice
Root and stem vegetable
Solaneous fruit
Stone fruit
Strawberry
Sunflower
Weed

References

External links
A  downloadable version of the BBCH scales